Cale is a surname and a male given name. Cale may refer to:

People

First name                                                            
Cale J. Bradford, American judge
Cale Case (born 1958), American politician and economist
Cale Conley (born 1992), American racing car driver
Cale Fleury (born 1998), Canadian ice hockey player
Cale Gale (born 1985), American racing driver
Cale Gundy (born 1972), American football player
Cale James Holder (1912–1983), American judge
Cale Hooker (born 1988), Australian football player
Cale Hulse (born 1973), Canadian ice hockey player
Cale Iorg (born 1985), American baseball player
Cale Keable (born 1976), American politician
Cale Loughrey (born 2001), Canadian soccer player
Cale Makar (born 1998), Canadian hockey player
Cale Morton (born 1990), Australian football player
Cale Parks, American musician
Cale Sampson, Canadian hip-hop artist
Cale Simmons (born 1991), American pole vaulter
Cale Yarborough (born 1939), American racing car driver
Cale Young Rice (1872–1943), American poet and dramatist

Surname
Bruce Cale (born 1939), Australian jazz musician
David Cale (born 1958 or 1959), English-American playwright, actor, and songwriter
Elton Calé (born 1988), Brazilian footballer
Franklin Cale (born 1983), South African football player
Guillaume Cale (died 1358), French peasant leader
JJ Cale (1938–2013), American songwriter and musician
John Cale (born 1942), British musician
Hrvoje Čale (born 1985), Croatian footballer
Maya Cale-Bentzur (born 1958), Israeli Olympic runner and long jumper
Pandeli Cale (1879–1923), Albanian politician
Paula Cale (born 1970), American actress
Ray Cale (1922–2006), British rugby player
Rosalie Balmer Smith Cale (1875-1958), American composer
Thomas Cale (1848–1941), American politician
Zachary Cale (born 1978), American singer-songwriter

Fiction
Cale (Ronin Warriors), a character in the anime Ronin Warriors
Erevis Cale, fictional character in the Forgotten Realms book series
Veronica Cale, fictional character in the DC Comics universe
Cale Tucker, fictional character and the main protagonist of the Don Bluth film Titan A.E.
John Cale, fictional character in the film White House Down
Thomas Cale, fictional character in the Paul Hoffman novel The Left Hand of God

See also

Caleb (given name)
Calle (name)

.